Garchuk Lachit Garh (meaning 'fort' in Assamese) or Fort, now popularly known as Lachit Garh, is located in northeastern India in the southwestern part of Guwahati city to the west of Ahomgaon. The fort was constructed under the Ahom kingdom during the times of Lachit Borphukan around the year 1670 CE, and stretches from the northern Fatasil hills at Garchuk locality cutting across the National Highway (N.H.)-37 at Garchuk Charali to the southern hills via Pamahi and Moinakhurung. The length of the fortification is about 3 km.

The fortification was built centuries ago to deter the Mughal cavalry with two earthen ramparts and two water filled lakes in between and ditches dug in front, which can be seen by visitors. But illegal encroachment has taken its toll on this heritage site.

References

External links

 Google satellite imagery of the Garh/fortification

Forts in Assam
Tourist attractions in Guwahati
1670s establishments in India
17th century in the Ahom kingdom
Buildings and structures completed in 1670
Ahom kingdom